Redondo Beach may refer to:

Redondo Beach, California
Redondo Beach station
Redondo, Des Moines, Washington, a small board-walk beach
"Redondo Beach" (song), by Patti Smith and covered by Morrissey

See also
Redonda Beach, a similarly named place in Portugal